Unió Esportiva Figueres is a Spanish football team based in Figueres, in the autonomous community of Catalonia. Founded in 1919 and refounded in 2007 it plays in the Primera Catalana league, holding home matches at Estadi Municipal de Vilatenim, with a seating capacity of 9,472.

History
Figueres was first founded on April 13, 1919. Bernat Palmer was elected as its first president, and Camp de l’Horta de l’Institut became its first stadium.  In 1983 the club first reached Segunda División B, and promoted to Segunda División only three years later, maintaining that status for seven seasons and appearing once in the La Liga promotion playoffs: after finishing third in the regular season, it eventually lost on aggregate to Cádiz CF.

Figueres spent the next fourteen years consolidated in the third level, only now and then vying for promotion. On 27 June 2007 the principal shareholder transferred the club to Castelldefels due to little support of the public, and the side would eventually disappear.

In August 2007 UE Figueres was refounded by minority shareholders, with the team starting playing in the lowest division of Spanish football, Quarta Catalana.

Season to season

7 seasons in Segunda División
17 seasons in Segunda División B
19 seasons in Tercera División

Notes

Team refounded

9 seasons in Tercera División
1 season in Tercera División RFEF

Famous players
Note: this list includes players that have played at least 70 league games and/or have reached international status.

Famous coaches
 Pichi Alonso
 Francisco
 Mané

References

External links
Official website 
Futbolme team proile 
Club & Stadium history Estadios de España 

 
Football clubs in Catalonia
Association football clubs established in 1919
Association football clubs established in 2007
1919 establishments in Spain
Segunda División clubs